"Templemoor", also known as the Post-Crawford House, is a historic home located near Clarksburg approximately halfway between Romines Mills and Peeltree, in Harrison County, West Virginia.  It was built in 1874 for Ira Carper Post, and is a -story brick mansion in the Italianate style. It features a combination hip and gable roof covered in polychrome slate shingles. It was the boyhood home of noted West Virginia author Melville Davisson Post (1869-1930) who was famous for mystery and fiction novels.  The home includes 13 rooms, many featuring top-of-the-line woodwork.

It was listed on the National Register of Historic Places in 1982.

References

Houses on the National Register of Historic Places in West Virginia
Italianate architecture in West Virginia
Houses completed in 1874
Houses in Harrison County, West Virginia
National Register of Historic Places in Harrison County, West Virginia
Buildings and structures in Clarksburg, West Virginia